Otto Rudolf Martin Brendel (12 August 1862 – 6 September 1939) was a German astronomer. Born in Berlin-Niederschönhausen, he obtained the first successful photograph of the aurora borealis at Bossekop in northern Norway in 1892. He died in Freiburg.

The asteroid 761 Brendelia is named after Brendel.

References

External links
 The Northern Lights – from mythology to science in Alta

1862 births
1939 deaths
19th-century German astronomers
20th-century German astronomers